Ulrik Arneberg may refer to:

Ulrik Frederik Christian Arneberg (1829–1911), Norwegian politician
Ulrik Arneberg (footballer) (born 1987), Norwegian football player